António Maria Braga is a Portuguese architect, who specializes in traditional Portuguese architecture. Together with the architect Alberto Castro Nunes, he was the 8th winner of the Rafael Manzano Prize for New Traditional Architecture, awarded in 2019.

Education 
António Braga graduated in Architecture in 1980 from the Escola Superior de Belas-Artes of Lisbon (ESBAL), today the Faculty of Architecture of the University of Lisbon, which at the time offered an exclusively Modernist curriculum. António Braga thus developed his mastery of traditional architecture outside his academic years.

Major Projects

Awards 
2019: Winner of the Rafael Manzano Prize, together with Alberto Castro Nunes

References 

New Classical architects
20th-century Portuguese architects
21st-century Portuguese architects
Living people
Year of birth missing (living people)